Mirhosseini–Holmes–Walton syndrome is a syndrome which involves retinal degeneration, cataract, microcephaly, and mental retardation. It was first characterized in 1972.
There is evidence that this syndrome has a different mutation in the same gene as Cohen syndrome.

References

External links 

Eye diseases
Syndromes with intellectual disability
Syndromes